The 1954 Ukrainian Cup was a football knockout competition conducting by the Football Federation of the Ukrainian SSR and was known as the Ukrainian Cup.

Teams

Non-participating teams 
The Ukrainian teams of masters did not take part in the competition.
 1954 Soviet Class A (2): FC Dynamo Kyiv, FC Lokomotyv Kharkiv
 1954 Soviet Class B (7): FC Shakhtar Stalino, FC Metalurh Zaporizhia, FC Metalurh Dnipropetrovsk, FC Spartak Uzhhorod, FC Metalurh Odesa, ODO Lvov, ODO Kiev

Competition schedule

First elimination round

Second elimination round

Quarterfinals

Semifinals

Final 
The final was held in Kiev.

Top goalscorers

See also 
 Soviet Cup
 Ukrainian Cup

Notes

References

External links 
 Information source 
 Кубок УССР. 

1954
Cup
1954 domestic association football cups